The 1941 Atlantic hurricane season was the period during 1941 in which tropical cyclones formed in the Atlantic Basin. It was a relatively inactive hurricane season, with only six known storms. It officially began on June 16, 1941, and lasted until November 1, 1941. These dates delimit the period of each year when most tropical cyclones tend to form in the Atlantic basin. Of the six cyclones, four attained hurricane status, and three became major hurricanes. The active season had an abnormally late start; the first system formed on September 11, nearly three months after the official beginning date. The season was also short-lived, as all six storms developed in rapid succession. On September 23, three hurricanes existed simultaneously in the Atlantic basin.

In total, the season resulted in about 63 fatalities and over $10 million in damages. The first and last storms of the season were largely insignificant, although the second, fourth, and fifth storms had considerable effects. Two hurricanes struck the United States: a major hurricane that struck Texas and Louisiana in late September, disrupting the Louisiana Maneuvers, and Hurricane Five, which made two landfalls in Florida, the first of which was near Miami at Category 2 intensity, inflicting widespread damage. Another major storm—Hurricane Four—traversed the Caribbean before striking the Nicaragua–Honduras border at Category 4 intensity, leaving 47 men dead at sea.

The season's activity was reflected with an accumulated cyclone energy (ACE) rating of 52 units, below the 1931–1943 average of 91.2. ACE is a metric used to express the energy used by a tropical cyclone during its lifetime. Therefore, a storm with a longer duration will have high values of ACE. It is only calculated at six-hour increments in which specific tropical and subtropical systems are either at or above sustained wind speeds of 39 mph (63 km/h), which is the threshold for tropical storm intensity. Thus, tropical depressions are not included here.


Timeline

Systems

Tropical Storm One 

The first storm of the 1941 season formed on September 11 in the northern Gulf of Mexico. This was an abnormally late start to an Atlantic hurricane season: only on two other occasions between 1887 and 1941 had no storms developed prior to September 11. The storm moved slowly in a generally westward direction for the next few days, peaking as a moderate tropical storm with winds of 45 mph (75 km/h). It then weakened until it made landfall along the northern Texas coast between Galveston and Port Arthur as a tropical depression, where it caused only minor damage. Near 0600 UTC on September 16, the storm deteriorated into a depression, and dissipated a few hours later. The storm briefly disrupted aerial activities in the Louisiana Maneuvers, but was of limited consequence as it weakened before moving inland.

Hurricane Two 

The Texas Hurricane of 1941

Upon forming, the system began moving generally northward. Over the next three days, the intensifying storm executed a gradual clockwise loop, moving to the south-southeast before turning back to the west. After intensifying to a Category 1 hurricane on September 21, the storm began assuming a more northwestward course, toward the Texas Gulf Coast. It continued to strengthen into a major hurricane, peaking at  late on September 23. About four hours later, at about 22 UTC, the storm went ashore east of Bay City, Texas, on September 23. It curved towards the northeast, passing just east of Houston, and accelerated as it continued to move inland. The cyclone transitioned into an extratropical storm on September 25, and was last recorded at 00 UTC on September 27 over northeastern Quebec, near the Torngat Mountains National Park.

Warnings and advisories declared in response to the storm were widely distributed, and approximately 25,000 people in the area evacuated their homes. Officials completed various precautionary measures. The hurricane inflicted severe damage; destruction to property was worth an estimated $2 million, with an additional $5 million in damage to crops, notably rice and cotton. Overall, the cyclone killed four people. The hurricane affected the southern Louisiana region one week before the Louisiana Maneuvers, a prelude to World War II. Heavy rainfall triggered flooding and swelled rivers, and army vehicles became stuck in the mud as a result. The inclement weather forced hundreds of military aircraft to move inland for shelter.

Hurricane Three 

It is estimated that a tropical storm had formed at around this time. The cyclone began to intensify as it briefly moved northeastward, before abruptly executing an eastward turn. It attained Category 1 hurricane status on September 19, and completed a clockwise loop the next day. It then tracked northwestward toward North Carolina, but began to recurve away from land late on September 22. It weakened into a tropical storm shortly afterward. The system dissipated on September 25 to the south of Nova Scotia. The storm had little or no effect on land, but caused significant delays for North Atlantic shipping. One vessel en route from Curaçao to New York encountered the storm on two separate occasions, recording Force 8 winds on the Beaufort scale both times.

Hurricane Four 

The Nicaragua Hurricane of 1941

It is estimated that it developed into a tropical storm shortly thereafter. Tracking westward, it passed just south of St. Lucia and emerged into the Caribbean Sea. By September 25, the storm had reached hurricane strength. Still intensifying, the storm continued generally westward and reached its peak at Category 4 on the Saffir-Simpson Hurricane Scale. By late September 27, the hurricane was situated near Cape Gracias a Dios, Honduras, and accelerated as it moved across the northernmost stretch of the country. It maintained hurricane intensity despite moving over mountainous terrain. Gradually weakening, the storm continued inland and weakened to a tropical storm by September 29. The storm emerged over the Bay of Campeche as a tropical depression and dissipated on September 30 while over water.

Approximately 47 people died at sea due to the hurricane. Two other ships sent out distress signals, one of which capsized, all hands lost. Damage on land was also extensive, and three people drowned at Cape Gracias, which was largely destroyed by the storm. Coastal flooding in the town was severe. In Belize, forests sustained major damage. For example, in the Melinda region, high winds brought down about 10% of the large pines.

Hurricane Five 

The Florida Hurricane of 1941

Tropical Storm Five was first observed to the north of the Virgin Islands on October 3. The storm tracked generally westward on October 4, strengthening to its peak intensity of 120 mph (195 km/h) at 12 UTC the next day. Now a Category 3 hurricane on the modern-day Saffir-Simpson Hurricane Scale, the storm struck Cat Island, causing major damage. However, the rapidly moving storm soon weakened as its track bent more to the northwest. At 00 UTC on October 6, the eye of the storm passed south of Nassau. Ten hours later, the small hurricane struck the north end of Elliott Key, Florida, and then made a second landfall within the hour on the mainland at Goulds, near Homestead. Winds at landfall reached 100 mph (155 km/h), and the calm eye was reported over Goulds. After moving across southern Florida, the storm had weakened to a strong tropical storm, but then restrengthened as it curved northwestward over the Gulf of Mexico. Turning toward the north and northeast, it crossed Georgia and South Carolina, and entered the Atlantic Ocean on October 8. The storm fully dissipated several days later.

Preparations for the storm were extensive; residents boarded up homes and businesses, while evacuations were recommended in some coastal areas. In the Bahamas, where winds reached , the storm killed three people. The city of Nassau was struck particularly hard, though damage elsewhere in the islands was also severe, with many homes reported destroyed. In Florida, damage was relatively severe, and included the deaths of several people. High winds brought down trees and power lines, and wind-driven salt water damaged vegetation well inland across Dade County, though the storm was characterized by unusually light rainfall. Storm surge in the Everglades region flooded local streets, particularly at Everglades City. As the storm progressed northward, the city of Tallahassee suffered widespread power outages and damage to numerous vehicles. Throughout the state, the hurricane inflicted $675,000 (1941 USD) in damages. The cyclone later killed one person in Georgia.

Tropical Storm Six 

A tropical storm formed on October 15, and passed through the southern Bahamas. It crossed the Florida Straits, and reached its peak intensity with winds of 50 mph (85 km/h) on October 20, after entering the eastern Gulf of Mexico and turning towards the north. It curved northeastward and made landfall at Cedar Key, Florida. After pushing inland, the storm stalled and weakened to a tropical depression on October 21 before dissipating fully the next day.

Gale-force winds were also reported. Some flood damage occurred throughout the affected locations. An infant was killed following the destruction of a house, possibly related to a tornado spawned by the tropical storm; the baby's parents also sustained injuries.

See also 

 Atlantic hurricane season
 List of tropical cyclones
 1900–1950 South-West Indian Ocean cyclone seasons
 1940s Australian region cyclone seasons
 1940s South Pacific cyclone seasons

References

External links 
 Monthly Weather Review

 
Articles which contain graphical timelines
1941 natural disasters
1941 meteorology